The national flag of the Republic of China, also known as the Blue Sky, White Sun, and a Wholly Red Earth and retroactively the Nationalist Flag of China, now more commonly known as the Flag of Taiwan, consists of a red field with a blue canton bearing a white disk surrounded by twelve triangles; said symbols symbolize the sun and rays of light emanating from it, respectively.

The flag was originally designed by the anti-Qing group, Revive China Society, in 1895 with the addition of the red field component in 1906 by Sun Yat-sen in his speech. This was first used in mainland China as the Navy flag in 1912, and was made the official national flag of the Republic of China in 1928 by the Nationalist Government. It was enshrined in the sixth article of the Constitution of the Republic of China when it was promulgated in 1947. The flag is no longer officially used in Mainland China due to the ROC defeat in the Chinese Civil War and the founding of the People's Republic of China in 1949. The ROC national flag has since then remained in use within the "Free Area", which include the islands of Taiwan and Penghu, those were former Japanese dependencies gained by the ROC following the surrender of Japan in 1945, and some remaining offshore islands off the Fujian coast and part of South China Sea islands.
 
The public display of this flag is still seen in historical museums and war cemeteries across mainland China but its use remains illegal as tools for subversion of state power. Some supporters of Taiwanese independence reject the flag due to its historical association with Chinese nationalism and as a statement of opposition against the Kuomintang, although the Democratic Progressive Party and its leaders still generally retain and use the current flag both domestically and abroad.

History

The canton (upper corner on the hoist side) originated from the "Blue Sky with a White Sun flag" designed by Lu Haodong, a martyr of the Xinhai Revolution. He presented his design to represent the revolutionary army at the inauguration of the Society for Regenerating China, an anti-Qing society in Hong Kong, on 21 February 1895. This design was later adopted as the KMT party flag and the coat of arms of the Republic of China. The "red Earth" portion was added by Sun Yat-sen in winter of 1906, bringing the flag to its modern form. According to George Yeo, the Foreign Minister of Singapore, in those days the Blue Sky with a White Sun flag was sewn in the Sun Yat Sen Villa or Wan Qing Yuan in Singapore by Teo Eng Hock and his wife.

During the Wuchang Uprising in 1911 that heralded the Republic, the various revolutionary armies had different flags. Lu Hao-tung's "Blue Sky with a White Sun" flag was used in the provinces of Guangdong, Guangxi, Yunnan, and Guizhou. In Wuhan, a flag with 18 yellow stars was used to represent the 18 administrative divisions at the time. In Shanghai and northern China, a "Five-coloured Flag" (Five Races Under One Union flag) was used of five horizontal stripes representing the five major ethnicities of China: the Han (red), the Manchu (yellow), the Mongol (blue), the Hui (white), and the Tibetan (black).

When the government of the Republic of China was established on 1 January 1912, the "Five-coloured Flag" was selected by the provisional Senate as the national flag. The "18-Star Flag" was adopted by the army and the modern flag was adopted as a naval ensign. Sun Yat-sen, however, did not consider the five-coloured flag appropriate, reasoning that horizontal order implied a hierarchy or class like that which existed during dynastic times.

After President Yuan Shikai assumed dictatorial powers in 1913 by dissolving the National Assembly and outlawing the KMT, Sun Yat-sen established a government-in-exile in Tokyo and employed the modern flag as the national ROC flag. He continued using this design when the KMT established a rival government in Guangzhou in 1917. The modern flag was made the official national flag on 17 December 1928, after the successful Northern Expedition that toppled the Beijing government, though the Five-coloured Flag still continued to be used by locals in an unofficial capacity. One reason for this discrepancy in use was lingering regional biases held by officials and citizens of northern China, who favored the Five-coloured Flag, against southerners such as the Cantonese/Hakka Sun Yat-sen.

During the Second Sino-Japanese War, the invading Japanese established a variety of puppet governments using several flag designs. The Reformed Government was established in March 1938 in Nanjing to consolidate the various puppet governments employed the Five-coloured Flag. When Wang Jingwei was slated to take over the Japanese-installed government in Nanjing in 1940, he demanded to use the modern flag as a means to challenge the authority of the Nationalist Government in Chongqing under Chiang Kai-shek and position himself as the rightful successor to Sun Yat-sen. However, the Japanese preferred the Five-coloured flag. As a compromise, the Japanese suggested adding a triangular yellow pennant on top with the slogan "Peace, Anti-Communism, National Construction" in black, but this was rejected by Wang. In the end, Wang and the Japanese agreed that the yellow banner was to be used outdoors only, until 1943 when the banner was abandoned, leaving two rival governments with the same flag, each claiming to be the legitimate Nationalist government of China.

The national flag was specified in Article Six of the 1947 Constitution of the Republic of China. The flag was also used in Communist-held areas until 1949. After the Chinese Civil War began to ease, the government of Chiang Kai-shek relocated the Republic of China to the island of Taiwan, whose administration was handed over to the ROC from Japan in 1945. On the mainland, the communist forces of Mao Zedong established the People's Republic of China and adopted their own national flag.

On 23 October 1954, the National Emblem and National Flag of the Republic of China Act was promulgated by the Legislative Yuan to specify the size, measure, ratio, production, and management of the flag.

Symbolism 

The "Blue Sky with a White Sun" flag of Lu Hao-tung was unveiled in February 1895 in Hong Kong. The twelve rays of the white Sun symbolize the twelve months and the twelve traditional shichen, a traditional unit of time which corresponds to two modern hours. Sun Yat-sen added the "Red Earth" to the flag to signify the blood of the revolutionaries who sacrificed themselves in order to overthrow the Qing dynasty and create the ROC. Together, the three colours of the flag correspond to the Three Principles of the People: Blue represents nationalism and liberty; White represents democracy and equality; and Red represents the people's livelihood and fraternity. President Chiang Kai-shek proclaimed on the National Day in 1929, "As long as a national flag with Blue Sky, White Sun, and a Wholly Red Earth flies in the land of China, it will symbolize the independence and liberty of the descendants of the Huang Emperor".

The blue-and-white canton of the ROC flag is often used as the party flag of the KMT. The flag has developed a great deal of additional symbolism due to the unique and controversial political status of Taiwan. At one level, the flag represents a clear symbol that Taiwan is not governed by the same government as Mainland China, as this flag is different from the flag of the People's Republic of China (PRC).

Meanwhile, because it was formerly used as the flag over all of China, the flag has become a symbol of continuity with the ideals of the Chinese nationalism and Chinese unification movements, and has become a symbol of a connection both historical and current with mainland China. In addition, the flag is derived from the seal of the KMT, and the colour of the field of the flag is associated with the KMT party colours.

Some Chinese see the flag as an expression of Chinese nationalism and pride combined with simultaneous disapproval for the current communist regime. Additionally, the flag may symbolize identification with, and admiration for the political thoughts of Sun Yat-sen, and his Three Principles of the People.

One irony is that given the association of the flag with Chinese nationalism in opposition to Taiwan independence, the ROC flag has found an unexpected ally in the People's Republic of China. The PRC has criticized Taiwan independence groups for wishing to change or abolish the ROC flag, and has implied that legal steps to do so would bring a strongly negative reaction from the PRC.

However, the presence of the ROC flag in Taiwan also distinguishes the fact that Taiwan and ROC territorial islands elsewhere fall under jurisdiction of a country separate from that of mainland China, the People's Republic of China (PRC). The hoisting of the ROC flag is even advocated by the most extreme Taiwanese independence supporters, such as Taiwan Solidarity Union members when emphasizing the separate and independently governed systems and territories of the Republic of China and the People's Republic of China in mainland China.

Construction details 

The specific designs of the flag are located in the "Law about the national flag and emblem of the Republic of China." The ratio of the flag is 2:3, with most of it being red. One-fourth of the flag is blue, which contains the 12 pointed sun. Each sun ray is 30 degrees, so the total sun rays will make up a complete 360 degree circle. Inside the sun, the blue ring is the diameter of the white sun divided by 15.

In later years, more details regarding of the canton area (also used as the flag of the KMT), were codified into law. In the drawing released in "Law on the Party and National Flag Manufacturing and Methods", the sun was drawn in more specific detail and mathematical values were given to all elements in the flag. In the law, the canton still had a ratio of 2:3, but the math values given were 24x36 meters. The blue ring that is on top of this sun and part of the rays is  diameter of the white sun, so the size will be 0.6. The angle of the rays, 30 degrees, and the total number of rays have not changed.

The colours of the national flag are dark red, white and dark blue. However, the KMT party flag only uses white and dark blue; both flags are to be topped with a golden finial. The law does not list any specific colour processes, such as Pantone, to manufacturing or drawing the flag. The Ministry of the Interior provides colours only for reference. Other publications, such as the Album des pavillons nationaux et des marques distinctives, have given approximations for Pantone colours: the dark blue as Pantone 301c  and the dark red as Pantone 186c. Album des pavillons also gave the approximate CMYK colours for the flag; dark blue is 100-45-0-10 and dark red is 0-90-75-5.

Colours
The colours approximation in other colour spaces are listed below:

Uses 
In the early years of the Republic, under the KMT's political tutelage, the flag shared the same prominence as the KMT party flag. A common wall display consisted of the KMT flag perched on the left and the ROC flag perched on the right, each tilted at an angle with a portrait of Father of the Nation Sun Yat-sen displayed in the center. For the summits held between the KMT and Communist Party during the Chinese Civil War, the ROC flag was displayed at an equal position to the flag of the Chinese Soviet Republic (Jiangxi Soviet). Later, the flag law specified a horizontal display of the flag with the portrait of Sun Yat-sen in a portion of the red field at the center position. This display can be found in numerous government offices in Taiwan and is that which the President and Vice President face to take the oath of office.

The flag has a ubiquitous presence in Taiwan. The hoisting and lowering of the flag are ceremoniously accompanied by the National Flag Anthem of the Republic of China while those present stand at attention to give a standard salute with the right hand, held flat, to the right eyebrow. Schoolchildren have traditionally been required to attend morning rallies where the flag is raised after a rendition of the National Anthem of the Republic of China. Before martial law was lifted in 1987 in Taiwan, it was required that all vehicles be halted when passing by a flag ceremony.

 Instead, the ROC is usually represented under a pseudonym (usually "Chinese Taipei").
The symbolism of the ROC flag began to shift in the early 21st century as there was a warming of relations between the pan-Blue coalition in Taiwan and the Chinese Communist Party on mainland China. The flag of the Republic of China has begun to symbolize a common shared history between both mainland China and Taiwan, and as such the government of the PRC has made it clear that for Taiwan to change the flag would be a major provocation in favor of Taiwan independence. The ambiguity surrounding the flag was made apparent during the trip of Kuomintang Chairman Lien Chan to mainland China in April 2005, during which the flag was very prominently displayed at ceremonies honoring Sun Yat-Sen at which both KMT party officials and government officials from the PRC were in attendance. One place in Mainland China where the White Sun emblem is still prominently displayed in public is the ceiling mosaic within Sun Yat-sen Mausoleum in Nanjing.

The use of the flag in Taiwan reflects the controversy behind its symbolism. Although supporters of Taiwan independence, such as former President Chen Shui-bian, will display and salute the flag on formal official state occasions, it is never seen at political rallies of the Democratic Progressive Party. This is not only because of its association with mainland China but also because the flag contains design elements of the KMT party flag. By contrast, the ROC flag is always extremely prominent at political rallies of the pan-Blue coalition. This difference extends to the colours seen at the rallies. Rallies of the pan-Blue coalition give prominence to the colours of the ROC flag, with very large amounts of blue and smaller amounts of red. Rallies of independence-leaning parties are filled with green, with no blue or red at all.

Some supporters of Taiwan independence, including former president Lee Teng-hui, have called for the abandonment of the flag, and there are a number of alternative designs for a specifically Taiwanese flag. However, the prospects for this are not high given that changing the flag requires a constitutional amendment; that the current flag has a huge amount of support among pan-Blue supporters and grudging acceptance among moderate independence supporters; and because changing the flag might cause political tension with the PRC. During the 2004 ROC legislative elections, it was briefly suggested that if the pan-green coalition won the elections that it would force the KMT to change the party emblem to be different from the flag. This proposal generated a few days of controversy and was then quickly forgotten.

There has been disagreement in the overseas Chinese community on which flag to fly to represent themselves, supporters and organizations of the Chinese democracy movement often fly the ROC flag rather than the PRC flag to symbolize opposition to Communist rule.

Desecration

Under Articles 118 and 160 of the Criminal Code of the Republic of China, it is a criminal offence to insult either the national flag or the national emblem of any country. If it is a national flag or emblem of a foreign country being insulted, the name of the offence would be ‘obstructing state diplomacy’; if it is the ones of the Republic of China, the offence would be ‘disturbing the order’. Besides, insulting or damaging the portrait of Sun Yat-sen is also punishable as ‘disturbing the order’. The penalty can be either incarceration for one year or less, or a fine of $9,000 NTD or less.

Flag gallery

Subdivisions

Military flags

Historical flags

National flags

Gallery

See also 

Blue Sky with a White Sun (the national emblem of the Republic of China)
National Flag Anthem of the Republic of China
 Chinese Taipei Olympic flag
 Flag of the Qing dynasty
 Flag of the People's Republic of China
 Flags of the Republic of China-Nanjing
 History of the Republic of China
 List of Chinese flags (including PRC and ROC flags)
 List of Taiwanese flags (including ROC flags)
 Military of the Republic of China
 Politics of the Republic of China
 Proposed flags of Taiwan

References

External links

 Etiquette of Raising the National Flag, Ministry of the Interior (Traditional Chinese) 
 Government Information Office, Republic of China
 Law of the National Emblem and National Flag of the Republic of China (Traditional Chinese)

China, Republic of
China, Republic of
 
 
China, Republic of